Princess Marie of the Netherlands (5 June 184122 June 1910) was the fourth child and younger daughter of Prince Frederick of the Netherlands and wife of William, 5th Prince of Wied. She was the mother of William, Prince of Albania. She was the last surviving grandchild of William I of the Netherlands.

Early life
Marie was born at Wassenaar, Netherlands, the fourth child and younger daughter of Prince Frederick of the Netherlands (1797–1881) second son of William I of the Netherlands, and his wife, Princess Louise of Prussia (1808–1870), daughter of Frederick William III of Prussia. 

Princess Marie was diagnosed with profound hearing problems at an early age. Like her sister Louise, she was considered intelligent - and very regal - but not attractive. Her marital considerations were also affected by the considerable fortune (enormous even by contemporary royal/imperial standards) that she would bring to any match. Her parents hoped to marry her to Albert Edward, Prince of Wales (later King Edward VII) but the Prince's mother, Queen Victoria opposed the match.

Marriage and family

Marie married on 18 July 1871 in Wassenaar, William, Prince of Wied (1845–1907), brother of Queen Elisabeth of Romania and elder son of Hermann, Prince of Wied and his wife Princess Marie of Nassau.

They had six children:
 Friedrich, Prince of Wied (27 June 1872 – 18 June 1945); married Princess Pauline of Württemberg, had issue.
 Prince Alexander of Wied (28 May 1874 – 15 January 1877)
 Wilhelm, Prince of Albania (26 March 1876 –  18 April 1945); married Princess Sophie of Schönburg-Waldenburg (1885–1936), had issue.
 Prince Victor of Wied (7 December 1877 – 1 March 1946); married Countess Gisela of Solms-Wildenfels (1891–1976), had issue.
 Princess Louise of Wied (24 October 1880 – 29 August 1965)
 Princess Elisabeth of Wied (28 January 1883 – 14 November 1938)

Ancestry

Notes and sources

The Royal House of Stuart, London, 1969, 1971, 1976, Addington, A. C., Reference: page 354.

1841 births
1910 deaths
House of Orange-Nassau
House of Wied-Neuwied
People from Wassenaar
German princesses
Princesses of Wied
Princesses of Orange-Nassau